Pla de Mallorca is a comarca (county) in the middle of the Majorca island, Balearic Islands, Spain.

It includes the following municipalities:

 Algaida
 Ariany
 Costitx
 Lloret de Vistalegre
 Llubí
 Maria de la Salut
 Montuïri
 Muro
 Petra
 Porreres
 Sant Joan
 Santa Eugènia
 Sencelles
 Sineu
 Villafranca de Bonany

External links

 Official website 

Comarcas of the Balearic Islands